James Bingham (23 January 1925 – 8 December 2009) was a Belfast-based painter. He spent thirty years in London working as a signwriter with his brother. In 1967 he returned to Belfast where he met fellow Belfast artist Daniel O'Neill. They became friends and from 1968 he worked with O'Neill in his studio until O'Neill's death in 1974.

Bingham was born in Belfast, Northern Ireland and died there in 2009, after a long illness.

References

External links 
 Profile Apollo Gallery
 Profile Gallery 4
 Profile O'Hare Irish Art
 Profile www.invaluable.com

1925 births
2009 deaths
Painters from Northern Ireland
Artists from Belfast
20th-century Irish painters
Irish male painters
20th-century Irish male artists